Pakubuwono IX (also transliterated Pakubuwana IX) was the ninth Susuhunan (ruler of Surakarta). He was born in 1830, the second son of Pakubuwano VI, and reigned from 1861 until his death in 1893.

He is attributed as author of Serat woro isworo a book about genealogy and morals.

Notes

References

 Miksic, John N. (general ed.), et al. (2006) Karaton Surakarta. A look into the court of Surakarta Hadiningrat, central Java (First published: 'By the will of His Serene Highness Paku Buwono XII'. Surakarta: Yayasan Pawiyatan Kabudayan Karaton Surakarta, 2004), Marshall Cavendish Editions  Singapore  

Burials at Imogiri
Susuhunan of Surakarta
1830 births
1893 deaths
Indonesian royalty